Bucculatrix lovtsovae is a moth in the family Bucculatricidae. It was described by Svetlana Vladimirovna Baryshnikova in 2013. It is found in the Russian Far East (Primorsky).

The wingspan is about 12 mm. The forewings are white, irregularly covered with beige scales mixed with darker scales at the base near the costal margin and in the outer field. The hindwings are grey.

Etymology
The species is named in honour of Yuliya Aleksandrovna Lovtsova, a Russian lepidopterologist who collected the species.

References

Natural History Museum Lepidoptera generic names catalog

Bucculatricidae
Moths described in 2013
Moths of Asia